The Museum of Modern Literature (LiMo) is part of the German Literature Archive in Marbach am Neckar, Germany. The museum won its architect the Stirling Prize in 2007.

Designed by British architect David Chipperfield and constructed at a cost of €10 million by Leonard Weiss GmbH, with engineering by Ingenieurgruppe Bauen, the museum opened in September 2006. It stands on a rock plateau in Marbach's scenic park, overlooking the valley of the Neckar River. It displays and archives 20th-century literature.

External links
 David Chipperfield Architects completes art museum in Germany
 WorldArchitectureNews.com information

Museums established in 2006
Archives in Germany
Ludwigsburg (district)
Museums in Baden-Württemberg
History of literature
German literature
Literary museums in Germany
David Chipperfield buildings